The Westo were an Iroquoian Native American tribe encountered in the Southeastern U.S. by Europeans in the 17th century. They probably spoke an Iroquoian language. The Spanish called these people Chichimeco (not to be confused with Chichimeca in Mexico), and Virginia colonists may have called the same people  Richahecrian. Their first appearance in the historical record is as a powerful tribe in colonial Virginia who had migrated from the mountains into the region around present-day Richmond. Their population provided a force of 700–900 warriors.

Early academic analysis of the origin of the Westo posited that the so-called Rechahecrian/Rickohakan of Virginia were perhaps Cherokee or Yuchi, and that the Westo were a band of Yuchi. Anthropologist Marvin T. Smith (1987:131–32) was the first to suggest that the Westo were a group of Erie, who had lived south of Lake Erie until forced to migrate further south to Virginia during the 17th-century Beaver Wars. The powerful nations of the Iroquois League extended their control into a wider area to gain hunting grounds. Smith theorizes that as the colonial settlements expanded in Virginia, the Westo migrated south to the Savannah River, shortly before the founding of South Carolina in 1670. Subsequent work by John Worth (1995:17) and Eric Bowne (2006) strongly supports Smith's hypothesis.

History
Virginia established a trading relationship with the Westo, exchanging firearms for Indian slaves. When the Westo migrated to the Savannah River, they quickly became known for their military power and their slave raids on other tribes. Before their destruction, the Westo wreaked havoc on the Spanish missionary provinces of Guale and Mocama. On July 20, 1661, a Westo war party canoed down the Altamaha River and destroyed the Spanish mission of Santo Domingo de Talaje near present-day Darien, Georgia. Florida governor Alonso de Aránguiz y Cortés sent troops to what is now St. Simons, Georgia to guard against further raids.

That the Westo had ties with Virginia colonists did not mean they would be friendly toward the South Carolinians. In 1673 the Westo attacked both coastal Indians, such as the Cusabo, and settlements of the Carolina colony. The colony depended on the Esaw (Catawba) tribe for defense until December 1674. Some Westo visited Dr. Henry Woodward and made peace. The peace became an alliance after the Westo escorted Woodward to their towns on the Savannah River, where they gave him many presents and encouraged friendship.

From 1675 to 1680, trade between the Westo and South Carolina thrived. The Westo provided Carolina with slaves, captured from various Native American groups, including the Spanish-allied tribes in Guale and Mocama. The captives were "Settlement Indians", bands supposedly under the protection of Carolina. The Westo likely captured slaves from the upcountry Cherokee, Chickasaw to the south, and the various smaller tribes who would later align as the Creek Confederacy.

Since the Westo were traditionally enemies with nearly every other tribe in the region, their alliance with Carolina effectively blocked the colony from establishing other tribal relationships. A group of Shawnee Indians migrated to the Savannah River region and met with the Westo while Henry Woodward was among them. These Shawnee became known as the "Savannah Indians". Woodward apparently witnessed the first meeting of the Shawnee and Westo. Using sign language, the Shawnee (Savannah) warned the Westo of an impending attack from other tribes.  They earned the goodwill of the Westo, who began to prepare for the attack.

The Savannah later approached Woodward and established an independent relationship with the colonists, which would doom the Westo. The Carolinians realized the value of trading beyond the Westo. When war broke out between Carolina and the Westo in 1679, the Savannah/Shawnee assisted the Carolinians. After they destroyed the Westo in 1680, the Savannah moved into their lands and took over their role as the chief Indian trading partner with the Carolina colony. The fate of most of the surviving Westo was probably enslavement after being shipped to work on sugarcane plantations in the West Indies.

 Some surviving Westo may have continued to live near the colony of South Carolina. A map published anonymously in 1715 shows Indian villages during the period from about 1691 to 1715, when the early Muscogee/Creek towns had relocated from the Chattahoochee River to the Ocmulgee River and Oconee River. The map shows a town labeled "Westas" (all the towns' labels are pluralized) on the Ocmulgee River above the confluence of the Towaliga River. It is one of a cluster of towns near the important "Lower Creek" town of Coweta. The 1715 map reflects town locations in the period when the Lower Creek moved their towns back to the Chattahoochee River. The town appears on the Mitchell map of 1755 just below the town of Euchees. As with several other groups of Indian refugees who found haven with the Lower Creek, the surviving Westo appeared to have been absorbed into the emerging Creek confederacy.

References

Citations

Bibliography

 Haggard, Dixie Ray. “The First Invasion of Georgia and the Myth of Westo Power, 1656–1684,” Journal of Military History 86:3 (July 2022): 533–56 abstract

Extinct Native American peoples
Native American tribes in Virginia
Native American tribes in South Carolina
Indigenous peoples of the Southeastern Woodlands
American slave traders